is a passenger railway station in located in the city of Hashimoto, Wakayama Prefecture, Japan, operated by West Japan Railway Company (JR West).

Lines
Suda Station is served by the Wakayama Line, and is located 41.1 kilometers from the terminus of the line at Ōji Station.

Station layout
The station consists of two opposed side platforms connected by a footbridge. The station is unattended.

Platforms

Adjacent stations

|-

History
Suda Station opened on April 11,1898 on the Kiwa Railway. It was renamed to its present name on January 1, 1903. The line was sold to the Kansai Railway in 1904, which was subsequently nationalized in 1907. With the privatization of the Japan National Railways (JNR) on April 1, 1987, the station came under the aegis of the West Japan Railway Company.

Passenger statistics
In fiscal 2019, the station was used by an average of 214 passengers daily (boarding passengers only).

Surrounding Area
Sumita Hachiman Shrine

See also
List of railway stations in Japan

References

External links

 Suda Station Official Site

Railway stations in Wakayama Prefecture
Railway stations in Japan opened in 1898
Hashimoto, Wakayama